Linda Danvers, also known as Supergirl, is a fictional comic book superhero appearing in books published by DC Comics. Created by writer Peter David and artist Gary Frank, she debuted in Supergirl (vol. 4) #1 (September 1996). She is not to be confused with Linda Lee Danvers, the secret identity used by the Kara Zor-El incarnation of Supergirl prior to the events of 1985's Crisis on Infinite Earths.

Publication history
Peter David adapted Linda Danvers as a separate character based on that of Kara Zor-El, who had been wiped out of continuity by DC Comics to enhance Superman's status as the sole survivor of Krypton. According to David himself, he was aware that many readers would still want Kara Zor-El back as Supergirl, so Linda was created for the fans to feel "more at home. So I gave her as many of the exterior accoutrements of Kara's former life as I possibly could. I gave her parents, and a secret identity of Linda Danvers, in a small town (called “Leesburg”, in deference to Linda Lee), and a boyfriend named Dick Malverne, and put Stanhope College nearby. Some fans thought I was being 'in-jokey.' Nah. I just wanted to make the old readers feel at home as best I could." Linda's Supergirl title (vol. 4) ran between 1997 and 2003, when DC decided to bring Kara Zor-El back as Supergirl. Starting from issue #51, Linda changes her traditional Supergirl constume to the one conceived for the DC Animated Universe, donned by Kara In-Ze.

According to Peter David, if his run on Supergirl had not ended, he would have had the series being a sort of Birds of Prey type comic, featuring the trio of Linda Danvers as Superwoman, Pre-Crisis Kara Zor-El as the current Supergirl, and Power Girl.

According to an interview with Newsarama, following the events of the "Infinite Crisis" storyline, editor-in-chief Dan DiDio stated that the Matrix Supergirl was wiped from existence. However, Infinite Crisis writer Geoff Johns later stated, "As for this…huh? Linda Danvers hasn't been retconned out at all."

Fictional character biography

Matrix

Linda Danvers (daughter of policeman Fred Danvers and his wife Sylvia) began her life in a less-than-heroic fashion. Lured into a world of darkness by her boyfriend Buzz, Linda was involved in many illicit and illegal activities (such as murder and torture). Little did she know that she was intended to be a sacrifice for a demonic cult for which Buzz worked. Buzz slashed her with a dagger to use her blood to release a demon into the world, but Matrix, the protoplasmic Supergirl, intervened. She used her shape-shifting powers to try plugging the gaping wounds on Linda, but instead became fused with her. Linda and Matrix became a new Supergirl. Armed with newfound superhuman abilities and the power to change from the Linda Danvers form to the taller Supergirl form, "Linda" (who was actually a merged Matrix and Linda) began to fight crime and demonic activity, on her road to redemption for all the crimes she's committed. She was hesitant to reveal her situation to her adoptive "brother" Superman, fearing his reaction to her co-opting a human life, but he accepted the change. Further complicating the situation was the revelation that Matrix's sacrifice in attempting to save Linda transformed her and Linda into the Earth-born Angel of Fire.

Earth-born Angel

When Linda became an Earth-born Angel (one of three, the others are Blithe and Comet), she developed wings of flame and flame vision. She discovered that she could teleport in an S-shaped burst of flame. She used her powers to fight demons and dark gods, and even her fellow Earth-born Angel Blithe. She met an angelic ally, the equine Comet, who was revealed to be her friend, Andrea Jones, and the Angel of Love, born in an accident in an ice cavern. Stranger still, Linda began to encounter a young boy named Wally, who claimed to be what is known in the DC Universe as the Presence (his name, he explained, was a variation on "Yahweh", the Hebrew name for the Almighty God). Wally helped Linda through her strange transformations, especially when her wings changed from angelic to bat-like. Linda also found herself fighting a superhuman named Twilight, whose dark powers were almost strong enough to overpower Linda's angelic abilities. Her greatest challenge came when Linda was captured by a strangely Wally-like man, who was the Carnivore, the first vampire. She defeated him, with the help of an angelic figure, simply called "Kara". In her defeat of Carnivore, her Matrix side was ripped away, leaving Linda alone once again.

Search for Matrix
After the split, Linda retained half of the super-strength and invulnerability she had when fused with Matrix/Supergirl and could only leap 1/8 of a mile. Using some items from a costume shop, Linda created a white, blue, and red Supergirl costume (the same costume used by the animated version of Supergirl in Superman: The Animated Series) and acted as Supergirl, while searching for Matrix, with the help of her demonic ex-boyfriend Buzz and fellow superhero Mary Marvel. Even with diminished abilities, she was still powerful enough to stop Bizarro, and even found herself fighting a Bizarro Supergirl. Linda's search led her to the Amazon, where Matrix was held prisoner by Lilith, the mother of all demons, who had sent Twilight after Supergirl, holding Twilight's sister hostage to keep her under her evil control. Lilith fatally injured Mary Marvel, Twilight, and Linda, but not before Matrix was freed from Lilith's prison. Linda asked Matrix to merge with Twilight, and Twilight became the new Angel of Fire in the process, using her powers to heal Mary and Linda, thus giving Linda all the powers she had had when she was merged with Matrix. At this point, Matrix passed the Supergirl mantle on to Linda.

"Many Happy Returns"
Linda was the new Supergirl for only six issues of the 1996 series. With her powers back to Matrix's original (non-angelic) levels, Linda encountered a rocketship that contained a young, vibrant Kara Zor-El from the Pre-Crisis reality. After a rocky start, the two became close, with Linda mentoring Kara on how to be a hero.

Kara's presence in the Post-Crisis era was going to destabilize time. The Spectre (Hal Jordan incarnation) appeared and said that Kara was destined to die. Apparently, a cosmic entity called the Fatalist had altered the timeline for his own amusement and to vex his master, Xenon, a being with a pathological hatred of Supergirl. Not surprisingly, the young Kara Zor-El did not tamely accept that she was destined to die at a young age, and tearfully begged Linda to find some way to save her. Linda lied to her, in order to calm her down and send her away; only after she had departed did Kara Zor-El realize Linda's intent—Linda secretly took Kara's place, and was sent to the Pre-Crisis era, posing as Kara and expecting to die in her place, in order to provide Kara Zor-El with a chance at life. The Pre-Crisis Superman uncovered her ruse (upon her arrival in his universe, she tried to repeat Kara Zor-El's origin story, but his superhuman abilities allowed him to notice details that made it clear she was lying, such as the fact that her costume was made of Earth materials) and admitted he was in love with her. The two married and had a daughter, Ariella. Linda even changed her costume. Linda's very presence had altered the timeline, so the Spectre made her return home, not only to restore the timestream but to save Kara from Xenon, who had captured the young Supergirl and planned to kill her.

Linda defeated Xenon, and had to send frightened young Kara back to her universe, knowing Kara, as an adult, would eventually die in the Crisis on Infinite Earths. Linda's daughter was spared from being erased from the timeline by the Spectre (Linda informed the Spectre if he did not save Ariella, she would let the universe die), but Linda was heartbroken over her actions. She learned that her parents had just had a second child, ironically named "Wally". Linda reunited with her parents for one last time before leaving everyone and hanging up her cape. She left a note for Clark and Lois explaining her decision, saying she felt she had let her loved ones down and so she was no longer worthy of wearing the S.

Reign in Hell
In Reign in Hell #1, July 2008, the team of Shadowpact attacks Linda Danvers in her Gotham City apartment, which makes Linda fight back. She manifests the flaming wings she had while merged with Matrix, but still loses to the collective powers of Blue Devil and Enchantress. However she is teleported to Hell, as Hell is recalling all of its "debts".

In Reign in Hell #6, Linda reappears in the Doctor Occult backstory. She appears as a fallen angel summoned by Lilith but mysteriously released. In Reign in Hell #7, Linda uses her flame vision to kill some injured demons who were huddled around a tiny campfire, Dr. Occult is horrified by her willingness to kill innocents. Linda believes that no one in Hell is innocent, and then accuses Dr. Occult of being a damned soul. Linda says she does not deserve to be trapped in Hell, and that she would see everybody burned to char before she accepted being kept in there. Dr. Occult casts a spell to show Linda who she really is, and she flies away in horror.

Powers and abilities
Original powers: Linda was originally a normal human, with no superhuman abilities. Upon fusing with the Matrix Supergirl, Linda gained her psychokinetic abilities. This granted her an incredible level of superhuman strength and speed, near invulnerability to harm, and the power to fly at high speeds. Linda was also able to produce concussive blasts of telekinetic energy, typically referred to as "psi blasts." Linda was also able to change from her normal, Linda Danvers persona into her "Supergirl" form which was taller, had blonde hair, and a larger bust. The transformation was purely cosmetic, as Linda retained her powers in either form.

Earth-Born Angel powers: After being merged with Matrix for some time, Linda became the Earth-Born Angel of Fire. While she retained her original abilities, she also gained the ability to produce bursts of fire from her eyes (called Flame Vision), form angelic wings composed of flames, and could use her wings to create a flaming portal that allowed her to "shunt" (teleport) long distances. Though Linda originally lost her angelic powers after being separated from Matrix, she later seemed to have regained them during the "Reign in Hell" mini-series.

Reduced powers: After being separated from Matrix, Linda found herself with reduced powers. She could no longer shapeshift into her "Supergirl" form, and all of her angelic powers were lost. In addition, Linda's strength and durability were reduced by half, she lost her ability to fly and produce psionic blasts, and instead was only able to leap around 1/8th of a mile in a single bound.

Restored powers: After encountering Twilight as the new Earth-Born Angel of Fire, Linda regained all of the powers that she'd possessed while initially merged with Matrix, sans her ability to assume her "Supergirl" form. Her strength and durability returned to their original levels and she was able to fly and produce psionic blasts of force once more.

Other versions
Supergirl: Wings reworks the Earth-born angel storyline; in it, Linda Danvers is a gothic teenager being corrupted by a demon, while her guardian angel Matrix believes Linda is beyond hope of redemption. The two eventually fuse into an angel that wears a Supergirl-inspired costume.
In JLA: Created Equal, Linda Danvers, fifteen years after a disease wipes all men from the Earth, changes her name from Supergirl to Superwoman.
In JLA: Act of God, Linda Danvers is one of many heroes who lose their powers due to the cosmic event that removes the powers of countless metahumans. However, she, along with Martian Manhunter (J'onn J'onzz), Aquaman (Arthur Curry), and the Flash (Wally West), train with Batman and his associates so they may still be heroes. Changing her name to Justice, Linda and the others form the Phoenix Group.
Peter David's Fallen Angel implied that Lee, the main character, might be Linda Danvers. When the title moved to another company, her real origin as a guardian angel named Liandra was given. However, IDW Publishing's Fallen Angel #14 introduced a character known as "Lin". While David could not explicitly state that this character is Linda Danvers due to legal concerns, he confirmed his intent in an interview.
The 2021 series Supergirl: Woman of Tomorrow pays homage to the Earth-Born Angel arc with Kara Zor-El displaying fire wings. Journeying throughout space, Kara saves her space bus crew from a Karpane dragon by taking a red kryptonite drug which causes kryptonians' "weird visions" to come true. Powered with the flame wings and energy, she destroys the Karpane dragon.

Collected Editions

In other media
 An alternate universe incarnation of Linda Danvers appears in the Smallville episode "Apocalypse", portrayed by Laura Vandervoort. This version is from an alternate universe where Kara Zor-El was raised by the Luthors.
Linda Danvers appears in the video game Justice League Heroes, voiced by Tara Strong.

References

Danvers, Linda
Comics characters introduced in 1996
DC Comics characters who are shapeshifters
DC Comics characters who can move at superhuman speeds
DC Comics characters who can teleport
DC Comics characters who have mental powers
DC Comics characters with accelerated healing
DC Comics characters with superhuman strength
DC Comics angels
DC Comics extraterrestrial superheroes
DC Comics female superheroes
DC Comics telekinetics
Fictional artists
Fictional characters with energy-manipulation abilities
Fictional characters with fire or heat abilities
Fictional characters with superhuman durability or invulnerability
Superheroes who are adopted
Characters created by Peter David
DC Comics metahumans